Bob Chow (November 30, 1907 – October 17, 2003) was an American sports shooter. He competed in the 25 m pistol event at the 1948 Summer Olympics.

References

External links
 

1907 births
2003 deaths
American male sport shooters
Olympic shooters of the United States
Shooters at the 1948 Summer Olympics
Sportspeople from Stockton, California